James Thomson FRS FRSE LLD (16 February 1822 – 8 May 1892) was a British engineer and physicist, born in Belfast, and older brother of William Thomson (Lord Kelvin).

Biography
Born in Belfast, much of his youth was spent in Glasgow. His father James was professor of mathematics at the University of Glasgow from 1832 onward and his younger brother William was to become Baron Kelvin. James attended Glasgow University from a young age and graduated (1839) with high honours in his late teens. After graduation, he served brief apprenticeships with practical engineers in several domains; and then gave a considerable amount of his time to theoretical and mathematical engineering studies, often in collaboration with his brother, during his twenties in Glasgow. In his late twenties he entered into private practice as a professional engineer with special expertise in water transport. In his early thirties, in 1855, he was appointed professor of civil engineering at Queen's University Belfast. He remained there until 1873, when he accepted the Regius professorship of Civil Engineering and Mechanics at the University of Glasgow (in which post he was successor to the influential William Rankine) until he resigned with failing eyesight in 1889.

In 1875 he was elected a Fellow of the Royal Society of Edinburgh. His proposers were his younger brother William Thomson, Peter Guthrie Tait, Alexander Crum Brown, and John Hutton Balfour. He was elected a Fellow of the Royal Society of London in June 1877.

He served as President of the Institution of Engineers and Shipbuilders in Scotland from 1884 to 1886.

In later life he lived at 2 Florentine Gardens, off Hillhead Street.

He died of cholera in Glasgow on 8 May 1892. He is buried on the northern slopes of the Glasgow Necropolis overlooking Glasgow Cathedral. One obituary described Thomson as “a man of singular purity of mind and simplicity of character“, whose “gentle kindness and unfailing courtesy will be long remembered.”

Legacy
James Thomson is known for his work on the improvement of water wheels, water pumps and turbines. Also his innovations in the analysis of regelation, i.e., the effect of pressure on the freezing point of water, and his studies in glaciology including glacier motion, where he extended the work of James David Forbes. He studied the experimental work of his colleague Thomas Andrews, concerning the continuity of the liquid and gaseous states of matter, and strengthened understanding of it by applying his strong knowledge of thermodynamics. He derived a simplified form of the Clapeyron equation for the solid-liquid phase boundary. He proposed the term triple point to describe the conditions for which solid, liquid and vapour states are all in equilibrium.

He also had contributions in the realm of fluid dynamics of rivers. It is claimed that the term torque was introduced into English scientific literature by Thomson, in 1884.

Publications
James Thomson's main published research reports in physics and engineering were republished as a 500-page collection after his death. The collection is freely available online (see below) and is prefaced by a lengthy (80-page) biography plus a more concise (10-page) biography. It is stated in this book that Thomson is the first to use the words radian, interface and apocentric in English, though he used a number of other neologisms that have not survived.

See also
Marangoni effect
Rayleigh–Bénard convection

References

External links

1822 births
1892 deaths
Presidents of the Institution of Engineers and Shipbuilders in Scotland
Engineers from Belfast
British civil engineers
British glaciologists
Fellows of the Royal Society
Ulster Scots people
William Thomson, 1st Baron Kelvin
19th-century Irish scientists
19th-century British scientists
19th-century Irish engineers
19th-century British engineers
19th-century Scottish businesspeople